JS Chōkai (DDG-176) is a  guided missile destroyer in the Japan Maritime Self-Defense Force (JMSDF). Chōkai was named after Mount Chōkai. She was laid down by IHI Corporation in Tokyo on 29 May 1995 and was launched on 27 August 1996. Commissioning happened on March 20, 1998.

Service
Following her commissioning in March 1998, she was dispatched to Hawaii for the Aegis System Equipment Qualification Test (SQT) until November 4, 1998

From May 16 to August 3, 2001, she participated in US dispatch training with the destroyers  Hiei and Samidare.

Chōkai, along with the destroyer Ōnami and supply ship Hamana were assigned to the Indian Ocean in November 2004 to provide assistance to the Japanese Iraq Reconstruction and Support Group. She returned to Japan in March 2005.

From May 16 to August 1, 2007, she participated in US dispatch training with the destroyers Kurama and Inazuma.

From 9 September 2008 to December 8, 2008, she participated in ballistic missile defense tests for equipment certification, during which an interception from her RIM-161 Standard Missile 3 failed due to a malfunction of the warhead's orbit and attitude control system.

This ship was one of several in the JMSDF fleet participating in disaster relief after the 2011 Tōhoku earthquake and tsunami.

In 2012, Chōkai, along with Kongō and Myōkō were deployed in cooperation with the US Navy in preparation for the Democratic Republic of Korea to test the Kwangmyŏngsŏng-3 Unit 2. However, the ships were withdrawn after the satellite did not violate Japanese airspace.

From June 7 to August 23, 2016, she participated in the biannual Exercise RIMPAC, conducted in the sea and airspace around Hawaii and the United States West Coast, accompanied by the helicopter carrier Hyūga.

In 2019, Chōkai participated in the Malabar naval exercise. She represented the JMSDF along with the Kaga, Samidare and a Kawasaki P-1. During this exercise, she took part in combat training, anti-submarine warfare training, naval gunnery training, anti-aircraft training, as well as offshore supply training.

Later in 2019, between October 15 and 17, Chōkai, along with the destroyer Shimakaze took part in the Canadian and Japanese joint exercise known as KAEDEX19-2 near Yokosuka, working alongside HMCS Ottawa.

As of April 2020, Chōkai is based in Sasebo.

Gallery

Notes

External links
GlobalSecurity.org; JMSDF DDG Kongo Class

Kongō-class destroyers
1996 ships
Ships built by IHI Corporation